Selle may refer to:
Selle (Scheldt tributary), the name of a river in Nord, France
 Selle (Somme tributary), the name of a river in Picardy, France
 Pic la Selle, a mountain in Haiti
 La Selle-Guerchaise, a commune in the Ille-et-Vilaine department, France
 La Selle-Craonnaise, a commune in the Mayenne department, France
 La Selle-en-Luitré, a commune in the Ille-et-Vilaine department, France
 La Selle-en-Coglès, a commune in the Ille-et-Vilaine department, France
 Željne, Slovenia, formerly known as Selle

People with the surname 
 Erich von Selle (1908–1976), German Luftwaffe Flying ace during World War II
 Johannes Selle (born 1956), German politician (CDU)
 Julius Selle-Larsson (born 1992), Swedish ice hockey player
 Linn Selle (born 1986), German policymaker
 Lorraine De Selle (born 1951), French-born actress in Italian genre cinema
 Thomas Selle (1599–1663), seventeenth century German baroque composer
 Ursula Selle (born 1933), Venezuelan fencer
 William Christian Sellé (1813–1898), Victorian doctor of music and composer

See also 
 Selle Français, a sport horse of France
 Selle Royal, an Italian manufacturer of bicycle saddles
 Selle v. Gibb, a landmark ruling on the doctrine of striking similarities
 La Selle thrush, a bird species in the Dominican Republic
 Farnese Vini–Selle Italia, a road bicycle racing team 
 Selles (disambiguation)